Purple glove syndrome (PGS) is a poorly understood skin disease in which the extremities become swollen, discoloured and painful. PGS is potentially serious, and may require amputation.  PGS is most common among elderly patients and those receiving multiple large intravenous doses of the epilepsy drug phenytoin. Compartment syndrome is a complication of PGS.

Cause

Purple glove syndrome is caused by the intravenous anticonvulsant phenytoin. This medication has many already established neurological side effects, however glove syndrome is a rare, but very serious adverse effect that may lead to limb amputations. This may occur due to the administration of phenytoin with or without extravasation. The defining characteristic is a purplish to black discoloration of the extremity followed by peripheral edema and pain distal to the site of infusion. Onset is generally seen within the first few hours of administration. The true pathology of purple glove syndrome is not fully elucidated, however it is believed to be due to the crystallization of phenytoin within the blood and extravasates into the surrounding interstitium. Another mechanism may be due to the disruption of endothelial transcellular junctions followed by leaking of phenytoin into the surround soft tissues.

Diagnosis

Treatment
Doctors recommend discontinuing the use of phenytoin. The application of heat can help to relieve pain. Oral phenytoin can also result in development of purple glove syndrome.

References

External links 
FDA: Potential Signals of Serious Risks/New Safety Information Identified by the Adverse Event Reporting System (AERS) -- January - March 2008

Cutaneous conditions
Drug eruptions
Syndromes